The Kilgore News Herald is a daily newspaper in Kilgore in east Texas. The newspaper is owned by M. Roberts Media, who acquired the paper from Bluebonnet Publishing in 2018.

History
Lyde Williford Devall and Charles K. Devall owned and published the Kilgore News Herald from 1940 to 1979.

See also
 List of newspapers in Texas

References

External links 
 Kilgore News Herald

Daily newspapers published in Texas
Gregg County, Texas
Newspapers established in 1940
1940 establishments in Texas